Eupithecia fuliginata is a moth in the family Geometridae. It was described by David Stephen Fletcher in 1958. It is found in the Rwenzori Mountains of eastern equatorial Africa.

References

Moths described in 1958
fuliginata
Moths of Africa